Helene Muri (born 1979) is a Norwegian climate scientist. She is a senior researcher for the Industrial Ecology Programme (IndEcol) at the Norwegian University of Science and Technology (NTNU), an interdisciplinary research programme specializing in environmental sustainability analysis. The programme aims to «provide high quality research and education in the field of industrial ecology for supporting the global community in realizing the Sustainable Development Goals.» Muri is also a researcher at SFI Smart Maritime. Her research interests include assessing the climate and environmental effects of various mitigation options in the maritime sector. She is a co-author in Working Groups I and III of the UN Intergovernmental Panel on Climate Change's sixth assessment report and is an adviser to the Standing Committee on Energy and the Environment of the Parliament of Norway.

Education and career 
Muri has said in an interview that already as a 13-year-old she decided to become a meteorologist. She took her education in the United Kingdom: She earned a BSc degree in meteorology from the University of Reading in 2003, and in 2009 she completed her doctorate in oceanic and planetary physics at the University of Oxford with her dissertation Evaluating forcings in an ensemble of paleo-climate models.

After completing her bachelor's degree, she worked for a few years as a meteorologist and researcher before starting her doctoral work. After completing her doctorate, she was a postdoctoral fellow at the Science and Technology Sector, Georges Lemaître Centre for Earth and Climate Research at the Université catholique de Louvain in Belgium. From 2011 to 2017 she was a researcher at the University of Oslo, and since 2017 she has been affiliated with the Department of Energy and Process Engineering (EPT) at NTNU, first as a researcher and since 2019 as a senior researcher.

As of 2021, Muri has been working on climate and environmental aspects related to the Paris Agreement, including options for reducing emissions in the shipping sector, negative emission technologies and solar geoengineering.

She emphasizes the importance of interdisciplinary teamwork in order to combat climate change. In her work for the UN's Climate Panel (IPCC) sixth assessment report, she is part of a working group of around 25 researchers that studies the climate impacts if the global fleet changes its fuel from heavy oil to LNG or natural gas, biofuel or hydrogen.

She believes that the Norwegian higher-education sector could contribute much more in the area of "green thinking" and has advocated that sustainability should be included in all educational study disciplines.

Publications 
 
  (The Norwegian Scientific Index)

References

External links 

 
  Interview with Helene Muri in Physics Today
 

Norwegian meteorologists
Academic staff of the Norwegian University of Science and Technology
1979 births
Living people